On May 31, a violent tornado outbreak occurred around Lake Erie, producing strong tornadoes in Ontario, Ohio, Pennsylvania, and New York.

Confirmed tornadoes

Notes

References

Tornadoes of 1985
1985 natural disasters in the United States
Tornadoes in Ontario
May 1985 events in North America
Tornadoes in the United States
1985 disasters in Canada
1985-05-31